Anguloclavus multicostatus is a species of sea snail, a marine gastropod mollusk in the family Horaiclavidae.

It was previously included within the family Turridae.

Description
The length of the shell attains 11 mm, its diameter 4 mm.

(Original description) (The described shell is evidently not quite adult) The shell is fusiform, with a pyramidal spire and a short siphonal canal. The shell is thin, smooth, shining, yellowish-white with red-brown blotches in three more or less interrupted bands. The shell contains 9 whorls, of which about 2 form a smooth, convexly-whorled nucleus. The post-nuclear whorls are sharply angular.  Their upper part is slightly concave and occupies about ⅔ of each whorl,. The sculpture consists of numerous, sharp axial ribs, 16 in number on the body whorl, with pointed tubercles at the angle, connected by a rather faint spiral..Moreover, there are very faint growth lines and spiral striae, more conspicuous on the base of the body whorl, especially on the ribs, and a few stronger ones on the siphonal canal. The aperture is oval, angular above, with a short, broad siphonal canal below. The peristome is broken, probably with very shallow sinus above. The columellar margin is concave above, directed to the left below along the siphonal canal, with a thin layer of enamel.

Distribution
This marine species occurs in the Mozambique Channel and off Madagascar; also off Indonesia, New Caledonia, Papua New Guinea and in the Bismarck Sea.

References

 Shuto, 1983, New turrid taxa from Australian waters; Mem. Fac. Sci. Kyushu Univ. Geol. 25 (1):10 pl. 1 fig. 9, 10
 Cernohorsky, Walter O. "Taxonomic notes on some deep-water Turridae (Mollusca: Gastropoda) from the Malagasy Republic." Records of the Auckland Institute and Museum (1987): 123–134.

External links

  Tucker, J.K. 2004 Catalog of recent and fossil turrids (Mollusca: Gastropoda). Zootaxa 682:1–1295.
 
 Specimen at MNHN, Paris (as Anguloclavus sp.)

multicostatus
Gastropods described in 1913